The Chinese Yachting Association is the national governing body for the sport of sailing in China, recognised by the International Sailing Federation.

Notable sailors
See :Category:Chinese sailors

Olympic sailing
See :Category:Olympic sailors of China

Offshore sailing
See :Category:Chinese sailors (sport)

Yacht Clubs
See :Category:Yacht clubs in China

References

External links
 Official website
 ISAF MNA Microsite

China
Sailing